Rahul Jain is an Indian singer, music composer , lyricist and a live performer, known for his works in Bollywood and Indian Television Industry. He debuted in Bollywood with his song "Teri Yaad" in the 2016 Hindi films Fever. He has composed over 250 musical tracks. He was nominated for the Mirchi Music Award for Upcoming Male Vocalist of The Year at the 11th Mirchi Music Awards for the song "Aanewale Kal" from the 2018 Hindi film 1921. His compositions in Kaagaz starring Pankaj Tripathi gained lot of appreciation . Latest bollywood film as a music composer - singer is Saroj Ka Rishta releasing on 16 September 2022 .  He have performed in more than 1200 shows worldwide .

Early life
He studied Civil Engineering. He started his music career participating in MTV Asia's reality show 'MTV Aloft Star' in 2014.

Discography

Films

Single

Television

Awards and nominations

References

External links
 

Living people
Musicians from Indore
Bollywood playback singers
Year of birth missing (living people)